The Government of the 13th Dáil or the 5th Government of Ireland (18 February 1948 – 13 June 1951) was the government of Ireland formed after the general election held on 4 February 1948 — commonly known as the First Inter-Party Government — was a government of Fine Gael, the Labour Party, Clann na Poblachta, Clann na Talmhan and the National Labour Party—and one TD who was an independent, James Dillon (who had resigned from Fine Gael after opposing its neutral stance in World War II). The parties had many different aims and viewpoints, but opposition to Fianna Fáil overcame difficulties in forming a government; Éamon de Valera had led a series of single-party Fianna Fáil governments since 1932. The cabinet was made up of representatives of all parties, and ministers were given a great degree of independence. Some key events during the lifetime of the government include the declaration of the Republic of Ireland in 1948 and the crisis surrounding the Mother and Child Scheme in 1951.

The 5th Government lasted for  days.

5th Government of Ireland

Formation
Fianna Fáil had been in office continuously since 1932, with Éamon de Valera as head of government (titled as President of the Executive Council of the Irish Free State until 1937, and from then as Taoiseach). However, after the 1948 general election, the party was six seats short of a majority.

At first, it seemed that de Valera would attempt to form a minority government. Negotiations for confidence and supply with the National Labour Party failed when National Labour insisted on a formal coalition; at that time, Fianna Fáil would not enter coalitions with other parties. Nevertheless, it initially appeared that Fianna Fáil was the only party that could realistically form a government. Even though it was short of a majority, Fianna Fáil was by far the largest party in the Dáil, with 37 more seats than the next-largest party, Fine Gael.

However, the other parties realised that between them, they only had only one seat fewer than Fianna Fáil, and if they worked together, they could form a government with the support of at least seven independents. As the second-largest party in the Dáil, it was a foregone conclusion that Fine Gael would head such a coalition. In the normal course of events, Fine Gael leader Richard Mulcahy would have been the prospective coalition's nominee for Taoiseach. However, Clann na Poblachta leader Seán MacBride refused to serve under Mulcahy because of his role in carrying out 77 executions under the government of the Irish Free State in the early 1920s during the Irish Civil War. Accordingly, Mulcahy bowed out in favour of former Attorney General John A. Costello. Costello found himself as leader of a disparate group of young and old politicians, republicans and Free Staters, conservatives and socialists. The government survived for three years, however, through the skill of Costello as Taoiseach and the independence of various ministers.

Nomination of Taoiseach
The members of the 13th Dáil first met on 18 February 1948. In the debate on the nomination of Taoiseach, Fianna Fáil leader and outgoing Taoiseach Éamon de Valera and John A. Costello of Fine Gael were both proposed. The nomination of de Valera was defeated by 70 to 75, while the nomination of Costello was approved by 75 to 68. Costello was appointed as Taoiseach by President Seán T. O'Kelly.

Members of the Government
The Ministers of the Government were proposed by the Taoiseach and approved by the Dáil. They were appointed by the president on the same day.

Parliamentary Secretaries
On 24 February 1948, the Government appointed the Parliamentary Secretaries on the nomination of the Taoiseach.

Republic of Ireland
The Republic of Ireland Act 1948 became law on 21 December 1948. It repealed the Executive Authority (External Relations) Act 1936, removing any remaining external function of the British monarchy in Ireland. It also declared that the description of the state was the Republic of Ireland. The Act came into operation on Easter Monday, 18 April 1949.

See also
Dáil Éireann
Constitution of Ireland
Politics of the Republic of Ireland

References

Further reading
 

Coalition governments of Ireland
Governments of Ireland
1948 establishments in Ireland
1951 disestablishments in Ireland
Cabinets established in 1948
Cabinets disestablished in 1951
13th Dáil
Ireland and the Commonwealth of Nations